The Serie B 1978–79 was the forty-seventh tournament of this competition played in Italy since its creation.

Teams
Udinese, SPAL and Nocerina had been promoted from Serie C, while Genoa, Foggia and Pescara had been relegated from Serie A.

Events
Relegations rose to four following the reform of the Serie C. The winners joined the Mitropa Cup.

Final classification

Results

Promotion tie-breaker
Played in Bologna on July 1st

Pescara promoted to Serie A.

References and sources
Almanacco Illustrato del Calcio - La Storia 1898-2004, Panini Edizioni, Modena, September 2005

Serie B seasons
2
Italy